Stigmella tropicatella is a moth of the family Nepticulidae. It was described by Henry Legrand in 1965. It is known from the Seychelles.

References

Nepticulidae
Fauna of Seychelles
Moths of Africa
Moths described in 1965